The Kardzhali Reservoir is a  reservoir formed by the Kardzhali Dam, situated less than 1 km to the west of the town of Kardzhali in Kardzhali Province, Bulgaria. It is the second largest reservoir by volume in the country.

The dam was constructed between 1957 and 1963 and was commissioned into service in the year of its completion. The reservoir has water catchment area of 1182 km2 and maximum volume of 539.9 million m3. When it is filled to its maximum capacity the reservoir covers are of 16.07 km2 and its surface has elevation of 324.3 meters above the sea level. The Hydroelectric Power Plant is situated at the foot of the dam.

The reservoir was recently seeded artificially with European perch. The fish was taken from the Ovcharitsa reservoir.

The first historical moment of the reservoir was in the 1970s, when it was artificially seeded with catfish. Nowadays there are 100 kg representatives. Later, 45,000 carp were introduced into the reservoir as well.

References

 Hydro Power Cascades and Dams

External links

Reservoirs in Bulgaria
Landforms of Kardzhali Province
Kardzhali
Rhodope Mountains